The 1967 Australian One and a Half Litre Championship was a CAMS sanctioned Australian motor racing title for racing cars complying with the Australian 1½ Litre Formula. The title, which was the fourth Australian One and a Half Litre Championship, was won by Max Stewart, driving a Rennmax BN1 Ford.

Calendar
The championship was contested over a six heat series.
 

Each heat of the championship was run concurrently with a heat of the 1967 Australian Drivers' Championship. That series was open to cars complying with the Australian National Formula or with the Australian 1½ Litre Formula. The above table lists the Australian 1½ Litre Formula class winners, rather than the outright winners.				

New Zealander Graeme Lawrence was not eligible to score championship points as he was not racing with an Australian license.

Points system
Championship points were awarded on a 9,6,4,3,2,1 basis for the first six places in each heat. Only holders of a full General Competition License issued by CAMS were eligible. The best five results from the six heats could be retained by each driver.

Championship results

References

External links
 Image of 1967 Australian One and a Half Litre Champion Max Stewart (Rennmax), at Symmons Plains, www.oldracephotos.com

Australian One and a Half Litre Championship
One and a Half Litre Championship